Mulciber may refer to:
 An alternate name for the Roman god Vulcan
 A fallen angel in John Milton's Paradise Lost
 Mulciber, two Harry Potter characters
 Mulciber (beetle), a genus of longhorn beetles
 Mulciber (volcano), an extinct volcano in the Dutch part of the North Sea
 Alucita mulciber, a species of moth
 Euploea mulciber, a species of butterfly